I Can See Your Voice is a Chinese television mystery music game show based on the South Korean programme of the same name. It premiered on JSTV on 27 March 2016.

Gameplay

Format
Presented with a group of seven "mystery singers" identified only by their occupation, a guest artist must attempt to eliminate bad singers from the group without ever hearing them sing, assisted by clues and a celebrity panel over the course of three rounds. At the end of the game, the last remaining mystery singer is revealed as either good or bad by means of a duet between them and one of the guest artists.

Rounds
Each episode presents the guest artist with seven people whose identities and singing voices are kept concealed until they are eliminated to perform on the "stage of truth" or remain in the end to perform the final duet.

Production 
JSBC first announced the development of the series through CJ ENM's joint agreement in June 2015. It is co-produced by Eslite Media, Hua Chuan Culture, and Inly Media Company; the staff team is managed by executive producer Jun Quanyi and director Zhou Hailiang.

Episodes

Guest artists

Panelists

Notes

References

 
2010s Chinese television series
2016 Chinese television series debuts
Chinese game shows
Chinese television series based on South Korean television series
Chinese-language television shows
Jiangsu Television original programming